The 2022–23 UT Martin Skyhawks men's basketball team represented the University of Tennessee at Martin in the 2022–23 NCAA Division I men's basketball season. The Skyhawks, led by second-year head coach Ryan Ridder, played their home games at Skyhawk Arena in Martin, Tennessee as members of the Ohio Valley Conference.

Previous season
The Skyhawks finished the 2021–22 season 8–22, 4–14 in OVC play to finish in ninth place. Since only the top eight teams make the tournament, they failed to qualify for the OVC tournament.

Roster

Schedule and results

|-
!colspan=12 style=""| Non-conference regular season

|-
!colspan=12 style=""| Ohio Valley regular season

|-
!colspan=9 style=| Ohio Valley tournament

|-

Sources

References

UT Martin Skyhawks
UT Martin Skyhawks men's basketball seasons
UT Martin Skyhawks men's basketball
UT Martin Skyhawks men's basketball